Frederick Chapin or Frederic Chapin may refer to:

  Frederick H. Chapin (1852–1900), American mountaineer and archaeologist
 Frederic Chapin (1873–1947), American composer and screenwriter 
 Frederic L. Chapin 1929–1989), American diplomat